Hard flaccid syndrome (HFS), also known as hard flaccid (HF), is a chronic painful condition characterized by a semi-rigid penis at the flaccid state, a soft glans at the erect state, pelvic pain, low libido, erectile dysfunction, erectile pain, pain on ejaculation, penile sensory changes (numbness or coldness), lower urinary tract symptoms, contraction of the pelvic floor muscles, and psychological distress. Other complaints include rectal and perineal discomfort, cold hands and feet, and a hollow or detached feeling inside the penile shaft. The majority of HFS patients are in their 20s–30s and symptoms significantly affect one's quality of life.

Sufferers typically report the onset of symptoms after trauma due to a mishap during sexual intercourse or tough masturbation, specifically a traumatic injury at the base of the erect penis, possibly affecting the dorsal artery of the penis, the bulbourethral and the pudendal arteries, as well as the pudendal and dorsal nerve of the penis. Penile sensory and textural changes, as well as changes in appearance, are hallmarks of the condition and serve to distinguish HFS from classic chronic pelvic pain syndrome or BPH.

Both biological and psychological influences contribute to the condition by altering the neurovascular supply to the muscles of the pelvic floor and penis. One theory proposes that HFS is a result of an initial stress which triggers an abnormal fight or flight response resulting in increased sympathetic stimulation to the muscles of the pelvis via the perineal branch of the pudendal nerve. In turn, a surge of adrenaline, noradrenaline and cortisol is released from the efferent nerve fibers promoting increased blood flow to the bulbospongiosus, ischiocavernous and levator ani muscles as well as sustained muscle contraction which results in obstructed venous outflow from the penis via compression of the deep dorsal vein and pelvic myoneuropathy secondary to neurogenic inflammation.

Treatment 

Treatment may include medications for pain management, pelvic floor physical therapy, biofeedback, and stress reduction techniques. Men experiencing anxiety or depression may benefit from counseling.

See also 
 Chronic prostatitis
 Peyronie's disease
 Pudendal neuralgia
 Kegel exercise

References 

Ailments of unknown cause
Chronic pain syndromes
Men's health
Penile erection
Penis disorders
Sexual dysfunctions
Urologic pelvic pain syndrome